('Palace of the Boyne' or more properly 'Valley of the Boyne') or Boyne valley tombs, is an area in County Meath, Ireland, located in a bend of the River Boyne. It contains one of the world's most important prehistoric landscapes dating from the Neolithic period, including the large Megalithic passage graves of Knowth, Newgrange and Dowth as well as some 90 additional monuments. The archaeological culture associated with these sites is called the "Boyne culture".

Since 1993, the site has been a World Heritage Site designated by UNESCO, known since 2013 as "Brú na Bóinne - Archaeological Ensemble of the Bend of the Boyne".

Location
The area is located eight kilometers west of Drogheda in County Meath, Ireland, in a bend of the River Boyne. It is around 40 kilometers north of Dublin.

Brú na Bóinne is surrounded on its southern, western and eastern sides by the Boyne; additionally, a small tributary of the Boyne, the River Mattock, runs along the northern edge, almost completely surrounding Brú na Bóinne with water. All but two of the prehistoric sites are on this river peninsula.

Description
The area has been a centre of human settlement for at least 6,000 years, but the major structures date to around 5,000 years ago, from the Neolithic period.

The site is a complex of Neolithic mounds, chamber tombs, standing stones, henges and other prehistoric enclosures, some from as early as 35th century BC - 32nd century BC. The site thus predates the Egyptian pyramids and was built with sophistication and a knowledge of science and astronomy, which is most evident in the passage grave of Newgrange. The site is often referred to as the "Bend of the Boyne" and this is often (incorrectly) taken to be a translation of Brú na Bóinne. The associated archaeological culture is often called the Boyne culture.

The site covers 780 ha (1,927 acres) and contains around 40 passage graves, as well as other prehistoric sites and later features. The majority of the monuments are concentrated on the north side of the river. The most well-known sites within Brú na Bóinne are the passage graves of Newgrange, Knowth and Dowth, all known for their collections of megalithic art. Each stands on a ridge within the river bend and two of the tombs, Knowth and Newgrange, appear to contain stones re-used from an earlier monument at the site. Newgrange is the central mound of the Boyne Valley passage grave cemetery, the circular cairn in which the cruciform burial chamber is sited having a diameter of over 100 metres. Knowth and Dowth are of comparable size. There is no in situ evidence for earlier activity at the site, save for the spotfinds of flint tools left by Mesolithic hunters.

The passage tombs were constructed beginning in around 3,300 BC and work stopped around 2,900 BC. The three largest tombs of Newgrange, Knowth and Dowth may have been constructed to be visible from each other and from northern and southern approaches along the River Boyne, as part of a scheme to "bind the previously disparate elements of the extended passage tomb cemetery into a more clearly defined prehistoric numinous precinct". The area continued to be used for habitation and ritual purposes until the early Bronze Age, during which a number of embanked, pit and wooden post circles (collectively referred to as "henges") were built. Artifacts from the later Bronze Age are comparatively inconspicuous: some cist and ring ditch burials and burnt mounds. For the Iron Age there is only evidence of sporadic activity, such as burials near Knowth and at Rosnaree. Valuable items from the Roman period such as coins and jewelry were found as votive offerings near Newgrange.

Numerous other enclosure and megalith sites have been identified within the river bend and have been given simple letter designations, such as the M Enclosures. In addition to the three large tombs, several other ceremonial sites constitute the complex including: 
 Cloghalea Henge
 Townleyhall passage grave
 Monknewtown henge and ritual pond
 Newgrange cursus

Astronomical alignments
Each of the three main megalith sites have significant archaeoastronomical significance. Newgrange and Dowth have winter solstice solar alignments, while Knowth is oriented towards the spring and autumn equinox. In addition, the immediate environs of the main sites have been investigated for other possible alignments. The layout and design of the Brú na Bóinne complex across the valley has also been studied for astronomical significance.

Visitor centre
All access to Newgrange and Knowth is by guided tour only, with tours beginning at the Visitor Centre, opened in 1997 in Donore, County Meath. The tourist visitor centre is located on the south side of the river Boyne, and the historical site is located on the north side of the river and is accessed via a shuttle with a tour guide.

Public transport access
Bus Éireann route 163 operates between Drogheda and the Brú na Bóinne Visitor Centre via Donore.
The nearest railway station is Drogheda railway station approximately 9 kilometres distant.

See also
List of archaeoastronomical sites by country

Gallery

Notes

References
 Lewis-Williams, D. and Pearce, D., Inside the Neolithic Mind, Thames and Hudson, London, 2005, 
 O'Kelly, M. J., Newgrange: archaeology, art, and legend, London: Thames and Hudson, Ltd., 1982.

Further reading
Stout, Geraldine, Newgrange and the Bend of the Boyne, 2002, Cork University Press, 9781859183410, google books

External links

 UNESCO's World Heritage Site description
 Official website
 Newgrange.com
 Knowth.com
 Brú na Bóinne - Archaeological Ensemble of the Bend of the Boyne UNESCO Collection on Google Arts and Culture
 Brú na Bóinne in myth and folklore

Archaeological sites in County Meath
Neolithic cultures of Europe
Neolithic sites of Europe
World Heritage Sites in the Republic of Ireland
Megalithic monuments in Ireland
Tourist attractions in County Meath
Boyne culture
Bronze Age sites in Europe
Archaeological cultures in Ireland
4th-millennium BC architecture